In chemistry, a space-filling model, also known as a calotte model, is a type of three-dimensional (3D) molecular model where the atoms are represented by spheres whose radii are proportional to the radii of the atoms and whose center-to-center distances are proportional to the distances between the atomic nuclei, all in the same scale. Atoms of different chemical elements are usually represented by spheres of different colors.

Space-filling calotte models are also referred to as CPK models after the chemists Robert Corey, Linus Pauling, and Walter Koltun, who over a span of time developed the modeling concept into a useful form. They are distinguished from other 3D representations, such as the ball-and-stick and skeletal models, by the use of the "full size" space-filling spheres for the atoms. The models are tactile and manually rotatable. They are useful for visualizing the effective shape and relative dimensions of a molecule, and (because of the rotatability) the shapes of the surface of the various conformers. On the other hand, these models mask the chemical bonds between the atoms, and make it difficult to see the structure of the molecule that is obscured by the atoms nearest to the viewer in a particular pose. For this reason, such models are of greater utility if they can be used dynamically, especially when used with complex molecules (e.g., see the greater understanding of the molecules shape given when the THC model is clicked on to rotate).

History

Space-filling models arise out of a desire to represent molecules in ways that reflect the electronic surfaces that molecules present, that dictate how they interact, one with another (or with surfaces, or macromolecules such as enzymes, etc.). Crystallographic data are the starting point for understanding static molecular structure, and these data contain the information rigorously required to generate space-filling representations (e.g., see these crystallographic models); most often, however, crystallographers present the locations of atoms derived from crystallography via "thermal ellipsoids" whose cut-off parameters are set for convenience both to show the atom locations (with anisotropies), and to allow representation of the covalent bonds or other interactions between atoms as lines. In short, for reasons of utility, crystallographic data historically have appeared in presentations closer to ball-and-stick models. Hence, while crystallographic data contain the information to create space-filling models, it remained for individuals interested in modeling an effective static shape of a molecule, and the space it occupied, and the ways in which it might present a surface to another molecule, to develop the formalism shown above.

In 1952, Robert Corey and Linus Pauling described accurate scale models of molecules which they had built at Caltech.  In their models, they envisioned the surface of the molecule as being determined by the van der Waals radius of each atom of the molecule, and crafted atoms as hardwood spheres of diameter proportional to each atom's van der Waals radius, in the scale 1 inch = 1 Å.  To allow bonds between atoms a portion of each sphere was cut away to create a pair of matching flat faces, with the cuts dimensioned so that the distance between sphere centers was proportional to the lengths of standard types of chemical bonds.  A connector was designed—a metal bushing that threaded into each sphere at the center of each flat face. The two spheres were then firmly held together by a metal rod inserted into the pair of opposing bushing (with fastening by screws). The models also had special features to allow representation of hydrogen bonds.

In 1965, Walter L. Koltun designed and patented a simplified system with molded plastic atoms of various colours, which were joined by specially designed snap connectors; this simpler system accomplished essentially the same ends as the Corey-Pauling system, and allowed for the development of the models as a popular way of working with molecules in training and research environments. Such colour-coded, bond length-defined, van der Waal's-type space-filling models are now commonly known as CPK models, after these three developers of the specific concept.

In modern research efforts, attention returned to use of data-rich crystallographic models in combination with traditional and new computational methods to provide space-filling models of molecules, both simple and complex, where added information such as which portions of the surface of the molecule were readily accessible to solvent, or how the electrostatic characteristics of a space-filling representation—which in the CPK case is almost fully left to the imagination—could be added to the visual models created. The two closing images give examples of the latter type of calculation and representation, and its utility.

See also 
 Ball-and-stick model
Van der Waals surface
 CPK coloring
 Molecular graphics
 Software for molecular modeling
 Molecular design software

References

External links
More on molecular models and a couple of examples from chemistry and biology  (article is in German)

Gallery

Molecular modelling
Surfaces